Iginuhit ng Tadhana (The Ferdinand E. Marcos Story), also known as Man of Destiny, is a 1965 Filipino biographical film about then-Senate President Ferdinand Marcos. Directed by Mar S. Torres, Jose de Villa and Conrado Conde, the film stars Luis Gonzales as Marcos, Rosa Mia as Marcos' mother Josefa, and Gloria Romero as Marcos' wife Imelda. The film was produced by 777 Film Productions and was first released by Sampaguita Pictures in the Philippine provinces on August 24, 1965, during Marcos' campaign for president in the 1965 presidential election.

The theatrical run of Iginuhit ng Tadhana was briefly suspended on September 2, 1965, by the Board of Censors for Motion Pictures due to the film having yet to be screened for the entire committee, though its exhibition was eventually allowed to continue five days later. Its sequel Pinagbuklod ng Langit was released in 1969.

Cast

Luis Gonzales as Ferdinand E. Marcos
Rosa Mia as Josefa Edralin Marcos
Gloria Romero as Imelda Marcos
Bongbong Marcos as himself
Vilma Santos as Imee Marcos
Chona as Irene Marcos
Tony Cayado
Ven Medina
Venchito Galvez
Jose Morelos
Marcela Garcia
Lourdes Yumul
Matimtiman Cruz
Renato del Prado
Pablo Raymundo
Conrado Conde
Jose de Villa
Nenita Navarro
Sabas San Juan
Jaime Javier
Willie Dado
Jimmy Evangelista
Mariano Honrado
Nellie Madrigal
Rey Tomenes
Emmanuel Borlaza
Marcelino Navarro
Naty Mallares
Aring Bautista
Dino Tuazon
Henry Stevens
Aurora Ilagan
Florencio Tarnate
Abner Villar
Pio Torres
Tita de Villa
Joseph Strait
Remedios Marcos
Vic Pacia
Teddy Valdemor
Joe Salazar
Jose Villafranca

Production
Iginuhit ng Tadhana was directed by three men: Mar S. Torres, Jose de Villa and Conrado Conde. Conde handled the first third of the film's story, which covered Marcos' early life and the Julio Nalundasan trial. De Villa handled the middle portion, which covered Marcos' career as a soldier in World War II. Lastly, Torres handled the film's final third, which covered Marcos' post-war political life and marriage to Imelda Romualdez.

Release
Iginuhit ng Tadhana was first released in eight provinces on August 24, 1965, after it was approved for release by a subcommittee of the Board of Censors for Motion Pictures. Its theatrical run, however, was suspended on September 2 by the board, which then required that the film be screened first to the entire committee before it can continue its exhibition; Chairman Jose L. Guevarra resigned immediately from the board due to the suspension being carried out in his absence. On the same day, as a result of the suspension, the film's gala premiere at Rizal Theater in Makati was halted despite the attendance of approximately 400 people, which included Marcos, his wife, his mother, and the film's main cast; the theater decided to screen the American film The Thin Red Line instead to compensate for the cancellation. By September 7, the film's suspension was lifted after a local court in Manila issued a writ of preliminary injunction to the board which ordered that it halt the suspension.

After the election of Ferdinand Marcos to the presidency, the film was screened as Man of Destiny at the 13th Asian Film Festival held in Seoul, South Korea in early May 1966, where it received a special award "for portraying the life of an outstanding Asian leader." It was also later re-released in the Philippines on June 18 for the 1st Manila Film Festival.

In later decades, it has since been claimed that people who were close to President Diosdado Macapagal, then running for re-election against Marcos, was behind the film's initial suspension.

Home media
In September 2022, the film has been made available on YouTube for streaming without charge by the Philippine News Agency.

References

External links

1965 films
1960s biographical films
Cultural depictions of Ferdinand Marcos
Films set in 1917
Films set in 1938
Films set in 1939
Films set in 1954
Films set in 1964
Films set in Ilocos Norte
Films set in Manila
Films set in the 1940s
Films shot in Baguio
Films shot in Bataan
Films shot in Ilocos Norte
Films shot in Ilocos Sur
Films shot in Manila
Films shot in Tarlac
Philippine biographical films
Philippine political films
Tagalog-language films